Cherkaski Tyshky is a village in Kharkiv Raion (district) in Kharkiv Oblast of Ukraine, at about  north-east from the centre of Kharkiv city. Cherkaski Tyshky borders to the north-east the village of Ruski Tyshky. It belongs to Tsyrkuny rural hromada, one of the hromadas of Ukraine.

The village came under attack of the Russian forces around the spring of 2022, during the Russian invasion of Ukraine.

References

External links

Villages in Kharkiv Raion